Thrifty PayLess Holdings, Inc. was a pharmacy holding company that owned the Thrifty Drugs and PayLess Drug Stores chains in the western United States. The combined company was formed in April 1994 when Los Angeles-based TCH Corporation, the parent company of Thrifty Corporation and Thrifty Drug Stores, Inc., acquired the Kmart subsidiary PayLess Drug Stores Northwest, Inc. At the time of the merger, TCH Corporation was renamed Thrifty PayLess Holdings, Inc. and Thrifty operated 495 stores, PayLess operated 543 stores.

In 1996, Rite Aid acquired 1,000 West Coast stores from Thrifty PayLess Holdings, creating a chain with over 3,500 drug stores.

History of PayLess 

In 1932, L.J. Skaggs opened Payless Drug Stores in Tacoma, Washington, which soon expanded across the western United States. Some stores were sold to his brother Samuel "L.S." Olnie Skaggs (then an executive at Safeway) along with some colleagues. L.J. Skaggs retained California PayLess Stores, which eventually became part of Thrifty PayLess. The remaining PayLess stores were renamed Skaggs Drug Stores in 1948, and Skaggs Drug Centers in 1965.

Peyton Hawes and William Armitage acquired a controlling interest in five drug stores in three communities in Oregon and Washington, which were named PayLess, and grew their chain through both acquisition and internal expansion. By 1984, PayLess Drug Stores was the largest independently owned and operated drug store chain in the United States.  It became a wholly owned unit of Kmart in 1985, as part of the Kmart expansion program created by CEO Joseph Antonini. In 1986, there were 225 PayLess stores. By 1990, PayLess operated in nine western states before its parent company was acquired by Rite Aid and the stores rebranded.

Acquisitions 
 1973 – Acquired Seattle-based House of Values and Portland-owned Gov-Mart Bazaar to form PayLess House of Values.
 1976 – PayLess bought 22 Value Giant stores, the majority of which were located in Northern California.
 1980 – PayLess acquired PayLess Drug Stores of Oakland, California, founded by Levi Justin Skaggs.
 1987 – PayLess purchased 25 Osco Drug stores in California, Idaho, Oregon, and Washington.
 1990 – Acquired Pay Less of Tacoma, Washington.
 1992 – PayLess purchases 124 Pay'n Save stores in Washington, Alaska, Hawaii and Idaho from Pacific Enterprises

History of Thrifty 

In 1919, brothers Harry and Robert Borun, along with brother-in-law Norman Levin, founded Borun Brothers, a Los Angeles drug wholesaler. By 1929, the brothers opened their own Los Angeles retail outlets under the name Thrifty Cut Rate. The first store was located at 412 S. Broadway in downtown Los Angeles, just across the street from the original Broadway Department Store.

After opening five additional downtown area stores, Thrifty opened their seventh store in the then recently completed Pellissier Building in the Mid-Wilshire district, on Wilshire Boulevard and Western Avenue, in 1931. This was their first store outside of downtown, and it was quickly followed by several new stores within a few miles of downtown.

By 1942, Thrifty Drug Stores operated 58 stores. By the time their 100th store opened in Studio City in 1950, Thrifty ranged as far north as Santa Rosa, California, and as far south as San Diego. Thrifty soon expanded outside California, opening a Las Vegas location in 1952. In 1959, the chain expanded into the Pacific Northwest with a store in Eugene, Oregon.

Store grand opening events were always a large spectacle, with politicians as well as movie and television celebrities involved in the ceremonies. Actor Errol Flynn participated in the 1941 opening of the South Pasadena store.

A neon Thrifty Drug Store sign is visible in the background of a scene from the 1954 Judy Garland version of A Star Is Born.

During the 1950s, a Thrifty commercial jingle played on numerous radio stations in Southern California:
Save a nickel, save a dime.
Save at Thrifty every time.
Save a dollar and much more,
at your Thrifty Drug Store!

Until the early 1980s, every Thrifty store featured a self-service tube tester, usually located near the cosmetics display case. Vacuum tubes were still used in a wide variety of consumer electronics such as TVs and radios, and the local Thrifty store was a convenient place to test them and purchase replacements. Thrifty published a brochure helping customers diagnose which tubes might be responsible for various TV malfunctions. The brochure also provided numbered stickers to aid consumers in reinstalling working tubes in their correct sockets.

In the early 1970s, Thrifty's parent began to diversify outside the drug store industry  through the acquisition of Big 5 Sporting Goods, a sporting goods chain, in 1972.

Thrifty expanded into general merchandising by the gradual acquisition of The Akron chain, 40% in 1976, increasing to 90% the following year, and eventually to 100%.

Thrifty's parent, Thrifty Drug Stores Co. Inc., became Thrifty Corp. in 1977 to better reflect the parent company's expansion into non-pharmacy businesses through the purchase of companies such as Big 5 Sporting Goods and The Akron.

During the 1980s, Thrifty further diversified by entering into several joint ventures with Herbert Haft and his East Coast-based Dart Drug that would introduce Crown Books and Trak Auto to the West Coast. Thrifty acquired 50% ownership of Crown and had opened several bookstores in the Los Angeles area in 1981.  In 1983, Thrifty acquired 50% ownership in Trak and also opened several of the auto parts stores in the Los Angeles area,

In Washington State, Thrifty went by the name of Giant T since the Thrifty name was in use by another chain of drug stores.  The name was later changed to Thrifty in 1984.

Thrifty Corp. itself was acquired by Pacific Lighting, the parent of Southern California Gas, in 1986. In 1988, Thrifty acquired Pay 'n Save and Bi-Mart. Following the acquisition, all Thrifty stores in Washington state were renamed to Pay 'n Save.

Thrifty closed all their Arizona stores in 1992 and withdrew from the state, selling the stores to Osco Drug.

Thrifty Ice Cream 

The Thrifty name and logo live on through Thrifty Ice Cream, sold in West Coast Rite Aid locations and various ice cream shops in the southwestern United States and over 200 across Mexico. Rite Aid preserved the Thrifty Ice Cream brand because it won numerous awards in its history, and remained well known for its affordable prices, quirky flavors, and iconic cylinder-shaped scoops. Popular Thrifty flavors include longtime hits Chocolate Malted Krunch, Butter Pecan, Medieval Madness, Mint 'N Chip, and Rocky Road, as well as more recent introductions such as Circus Animal Cookies, made with real Mother's Cookies.

Thrifty Ice Cream counters located within Rite Aid stores sell hand-scooped ice cream in single-, double- or triple-scoop servings on sugar, cake, or waffle cones. The ice cream also comes pre-packaged in 1.75-quart (56 oz) "sqrounder" cartons ("kind of square, kind of round") and 1-pint cartons. Thrifty traditionally sold packaged ice cream by the half gallon in simple, waxed-paper boxes formed by folding interlocking flaps; these distinctive brick-like boxes were phased out in early 2008.

Like most early-twentieth-century drug stores featuring an in-store grill and soda fountain, Thrifty initially purchased ice cream from local suppliers.  However, as Thrifty constantly opened new stores and expanded rapidly throughout Los Angeles, it became increasingly difficult to secure a steady supply of high-quality ice cream at a low price. To meet the demand created by their new stores, the Boruns decided in 1940 to produce their own ice cream by purchasing Borden Ice Cream Company's existing Hollywood factory for $250,000.

Thrifty replaced the Hollywood plant in 1976 with a larger, 20,000-square-foot facility located on 3 acres in El Monte, California. Intended to supply the then-existing 450 Thrifty stores as well as outside purveyors, the new facility was initially capable of producing 16 million gallons of ice cream annually. In 2010, the plant produced ice cream for 599 Rite Aid stores across California, as well as wholesale customers such as Farrell's Ice Cream Parlour and Costco, which accounted for 40% of sales. The reborn Farrell's franchise tested a hundred brands before reselecting Thrifty as its supplier and winning the Orange County Register's 2010 Best Ice Cream contest. Thrifty makes its ice cream using a flash-freeze technique in the manufacturing process to minimize the size of ice crystals. The final product is frozen at −60 degrees for at least a day before leaving the factory.

Thrifty ice cream has won numerous gold medals at the Los Angeles County Fair and California State Fair since 1948. Reporting on Thrifty's thirteenth consecutive gold at both fairs in 1961, the Torrance Herald explained that ice cream at these "two widely acclaimed competitions" is judged on flavor, body, texture, sanitation, color, and packaging. Thrifty has won gold medals at the L.A. County Fair every year since 1952. In 1988, Thrifty ice cream received a total of 24 gold medals at the L.A. County Fair, more than any other competitor.

Many recipes have remained unchanged for over 50 years, and real pieces of fruit and cookie are used along with Real California Milk. Thrifty ice cream contains 10.25% butterfat, compared to 12–16% butterfat in premium rivals costing twice as much. As recently as 1974, a single scoop could be purchased for just a nickel. The price increased to $0.10 by 1976, to $0.15 by 1981, to $0.35 by 1991, to $1.29 by 2010, to $1.69 by 2011, to $1.79 by 2013, and to $1.99 by 2018.

For many decades, Thrifty Drug Stores was using the extremely low price that it was charging customers for a single scoop of ice cream that was usually eaten inside the store as a loss leader to entice those customers to bring their entire families into the store on a regular basis to eat ice cream that was sold at or below cost while those same customers browse the aisle (while eating) and usually find other items to purchase before leaving the store.

Thrifty achieved Kosher certification for its ice cream products in 1994.

Since 1995, Bon Suisse, a Poway, California-based company, has held an exclusive license to use the Thrifty brand name and sells 800,000 gallons of Thrifty ice cream in the Southwest US, Mexico, Latin America, and the Middle East. In May 2018, Bon Suisse bought close to 800,000 gallons of Thrifty ice cream a year to redistribute through restaurants, hotels, ice cream dipping stations, grocery stores and a few prisons located in California, Arizona, Nevada and Mexico.

In May 2014, Helados Thrifty, the licensed purveyor in Mexico, had 184 locations in the northern and central Mexican states of Baja California, Baja California Sur, Sonora, Sinaloa, Jalisco, Colima, Nayarit, and the State of Mexico. There are plans to expand throughout Mexico via the sale of additional franchises. All Thrifty ice cream sold in Mexico is produced by the El Monte, California, plant.

In October 2015, Walgreens announced that it will acquire Rite Aid, but said that it had not yet made a decision whether it would continue to carry any product line that is sold by Rite Aid, which is not currently distributed by Walgreens. Thrifty Ice Cream customers were concerned that Walgreens would discontinue carrying their beloved ice cream.

After the Walgreens deal was not approved by regulators, it was announced on Feb. 20, 2018 that Albertsons and Rite Aid will merge.

In May 2018, Albertsons announced that it plans to sell the Thrifty branded ice cream at its groceries stores (such as Vons and Safeway), but the announcement left many questions unanswered, such as would it keep the Thrifty manufacturing facility in El Monte, would it continue to use its current ice cream manufacturing recipes, would it keep the in-store scoop shops or would it keep the current price structure. Some Thrifty Ice cream customers are concerned that Albertsons may sell the plant and that the "new" Thrifty Ice Cream would be identical to the Lucerne and Signature Select store brands but just packaged in a different box.

In August 2018, Rite Aid announced that it had decided to call off its proposed merger with Albertsons and remain independent for the moment.

In May 2019, Rite Aid announced that it had expanded the distribution of prepackaged 48-ounce containers of Thrifty branded ice cream in up to eight out of 23 available flavors to Rite Aid stores in Idaho, Oregon and Washington. At the time of the announcement, there are no plans to sell ice cream by the scoop at those new stores outside of California. Two months later, Rite Aid announced that they plan to expand the distribution of Thrifty Ice Cream in 48-ounce pre-packaged containers to select Rite Aid stores in Delaware, Maryland, New Jersey, New York and Pennsylvania on a trial basis starting in July.

Notes 
 Pay Less to jump $1 billion sales hurdle in 1984 Discount Store News,  July 23, 1984
 Pay Less changes mix, closes Wonder World units - Annual Industry Report, part 2 Discount Store News,  July 18, 1988
 Thrifty PayLess.  Drug Store News, April 28, 1997

References

External links 
 History of Thrifty PayLess (prior to acquisition by Rite Aid)
 Thrifty Ice Cream Mexico 
 Thrifty Ice Cream @ Rite Aid
 A look inside the Thrifty ice cream plant (video)

Rite Aid
Skaggs family
Retail companies established in 1919
Defunct pharmacies of the United States
Pay 'n Save
Retail companies disestablished in 1998
Health care companies based in California